Poorly Made in China: An Insider's Account of the Tactics Behind China's Production Game is a book by Paul Midler, which chronicles his years spent working with American businessmen whose companies' products are manufactured in China.  Poorly Made in China describes the practice of quality fade—the deliberate and secret effort of Chinese manufacturers to widen profit margins through the reduction of quality inputs.

Awards 

Best Book 2009 (The Economist)

Best Book for Business Owners (Inc.)

Great Finance Book of 2009 (Forbes)

Best of 2009 Business Book (Library Journal)

Related 

The "quality fade" described by Midler has been likened to the Thick Face, Black Heart cultural theory.

International Editions 

A Chinese edition of the book was launched in Taipei in Feb 2011.

References

Further reading 
 Book review: The darker side of China's rise as the factory to the world by Kerry Brown, Senior fellow in Asian research at Chatham House
 Book review: Outplaying your partner. Poorly Made in China by Paul Midler Reviewed by Muhammad Cohen, Asia Times Online
 Poorly made. Why so many Chinese products are born to be bad, The Economist
 Dealing With China's 'Quality Fade' by Paul Midler, Forbes 26 July 2007.

Economic history of the People's Republic of China
Trade in China
Economics books
Manufacturing in China
Wiley (publisher) books